Jiang Wen (born 5 January 1963) is a Chinese actor, screenwriter, and director. As a director, he is sometimes grouped with the "Sixth Generation" that emerged in the 1990s. Jiang is also well known internationally as an actor, having starred with Gong Li in Zhang Yimou's debut film Red Sorghum (1986), and more recently as Baze Malbus in the Star Wars film Rogue One (2016). He is the older brother of fellow actor Jiang Wu.

Career
Born in Tangshan, Hebei, in a family of military personnel, Jiang relocated to Beijing at the age of ten. In 1973 he attended Beijing No. 72 Middle School, where he studied alongside Ying Da. In 1980, he entered China's foremost acting school, the Central Academy of Drama, graduating in 1984. After graduation, he was assigned to China Youth Art Institute as an actor. That same year, he started acting both on the stage (with the China Youth Theater) and in films.

Jiang's debut role was in the film The Last Empress, where he portrayed Puyi. He then starred in Hibiscus Town directed by Xie Jin; his role as an intellectual revolutionary earned him the Best Actor Award at the Hundred Flowers Awards. Jiang once again paired with Hibiscus Town co-star in the film Chun Tao directed by Ling Zifeng. Jiang was cast in Zhang Yimou's debut film Red Sorghum.  
Jiang also featured in the France-Chinese film Tears of the Bridal Sedan, and his first commercial film The Trial.

After appearing in many television series and films, Jiang became known in China for his role in the 1992 television series A Native of Beijing in New York, based on the novel Beijinger in New York, which made him one of the most popular actors of his generation. In addition to these he also starred in Black Snow (1990), Li Lianying: The Imperial Eunuch (1991), The Emperor's Shadow (1996), and The Soong Sisters (1997). Apart from Red Sorghum, Jiang also collaborated with Zhang Yimou for the 1997 film Keep Cool.

Jiang wrote and directed his first film in 1994, In the Heat of the Sun, adapted from a novel by Wang Shuo. A tale set in the Cultural Revolution, it won for its young lead actor Xia Yu the Best Actor prize at the Venice Film Festival and garnered six Golden Horse Awards in Taiwan.

In 2000, Jiang co-wrote and directed the black comedy film Devils on the Doorstep. The film premiered at the  2000 Cannes Film Festival and clinched the Grand Prix but was subsequently banned in its home country; said to undermine the country because it "seriously distorts Chinese history". Jiang himself was banned from making films for seven years. In 2001 he was a member of the jury at the 23rd Moscow International Film Festival.

Jiang starred in several films in the early 2000s; namely The Missing Gun, Green Tea, My Father and I, Warriors of Heaven and Earth, Jasmine Women and Letter from an Unknown Woman.

Jiang has also acted in television series, such as Da Qing Fengyun (2006), in which he played Hong Taiji. He also played notable historical figures, Mao Renfeng in the propaganda film The Founding of a Republic; and Cao Cao in the historical war film The Lost Bladesman.

Jiang returned with his fourth feature The Sun Also Rises in 2007; a fantasy realism film which contains a polyptych of interconnected stories in different time-zones; the film received positive reviews from critics but bombed at the box office. He then collaborated with 10 other directors on the romance anthology film New York, I Love You.

Jiang's fifth feature, a Western-styled action comedy Let the Bullets Fly set a box office record by becoming the fastest Chinese-language film to break RMB100m mark ($15.15m) in Chinese cinemas; and received critical acclaim.

In 2013 he was named as a member of the jury at the 70th Venice International Film Festival.

In 2014, Jiang directed the action comedy film Gone with the Bullets, which screened at the 65th Berlin International Film Festival.

Jiang co-starred in the Star Wars anthology film Rogue One, released in December 2016. In the film, he portrays Baze Malbus, a native of the moon of Jedha who is drawn into the war against the Galactic Empire.

In 2018, Jiang directed the Republican-era spy comedy Hidden Man. The film was China's submission to the 91st Academy Awards.

Jiang is set to return to the small screen in upcoming historical drama Cao Cao.

Personal life

Family 

Jiang Wen's father is Jiang Hongqi, a veteran of the Korean War. Described as taciturn and bookish, he played a minor role in his son's 2011 film, Let the Bullets Fly. Jiang's mother Gao Yang — “a cheerful, extroverted woman” — worked as a piano teacher. Jiang Wen is the eldest son in the family; in addition to his younger brother, Jiang Wu, he has a younger sister, Jiang Huan.

Close to his family, Jiang has a deep bond with his parents: whenever he is on site for shooting or acting, he arranges for them to come to his workplace so that he can spend time with them. Each movie he makes, he saves the best seats for them and asks for their opinions. Even on artistic composition, he sometimes resorts to them for advice. It was his parents' endorsement on the original novel of A Native of Beijing in New York that propelled Jiang into his performance. Later, during the filming of his first feature film, In the Heat of the Sun, Jiang again considered their evaluation of Xia Yu, before settling on him as the leading actor.

Relationship 

Jiang met his first partner, Liu Xiaoqing during the production of his debut film Hibiscus Town. As he was 23 and she was 31, their relationship was controversial in the entertainment industry at that time, although it was reported that the crew was very supportive of their relationship. Liu Xiaoqing never confirmed the relationship, but only claimed that the media pressure was so suffocating that she once considered going abroad. Years later at one ceremony, Director Xie Jin finally verified this rumor, revealing that they had actually lived together for three years. Liu and Jiang separated amicably in 1994.

In 1995, Jiang began a relationship with Sandrine Chenivesse, a Doctor of Anthropology at the University of Paris, researching philosophy and Taoism in China, at an artistic event. In 1997, they were married in Paris and conceived a daughter together, but the marriage remained discreet until their appearance on the red carpet of the 2000 Cannes Film Festival.  In 2005, Chenivesse announced divorce with Jiang, citing long-distance separation as the cause.

In 2001, during the filming of Warriors of Heaven and Earth, Jiang was introduced to cast member Zhou Yun, by fellow actress Zhao Wei. Later, Jiang recommended Zhou to the cast of The Music Box, but each left the crew after a creative difference between Jiang and the director Chen Yifei. After a period of media rumors, Jiang and Zhou were officially married at the end of 2005, and have conceived two sons.

Filmography

Film

Television series

Accolades

References

Sources
Silbergeld, Jerome (2008), Body in Question: Image and Illusion in Two Chinese Films by Director Jiang Wen (Princeton: Princeton University Press)

External links 
TIMEasia article on Jiang Wen

 

1963 births
Male actors from Hebei
Chinese expatriates in France
Film directors from Hebei
Living people
People from Tangshan
Central Academy of Drama alumni
Screenwriters from Hebei
Chinese male film actors
Chinese male television actors
Chinese film directors
21st-century Chinese male actors
20th-century Chinese male actors
Members of the 8th Chinese People's Political Consultative Conference
Members of the 9th Chinese People's Political Consultative Conference
Members of the 10th Chinese People's Political Consultative Conference